Anastasia Petrova (born ) is a Russian weightlifter, who competed in the 58 kg category and represented Russia at international competitions. She won the silver medal at the 2014 Summer Youth Olympics.

Major results

References

External links

1997 births
Living people
Russian female weightlifters
Place of birth missing (living people)
Weightlifters at the 2014 Summer Youth Olympics 
20th-century Russian women
21st-century Russian women